Tepache is a fermented beverage made from the peel and the rind of pineapples, and is sweetened either with piloncillo or brown sugar, seasoned with powdered cinnamon, and served cold. Though tepache is fermented for several days, the resulting drink does not contain much alcohol. In Mexican culinary practice, the alcoholic content of tepache may be increased with a small amount of beer.

In Mexico, tepache is usually sold as a chilled drink by street vendors. It is usually stored in barrels to make the fermentation process faster.  It is served either in a clay mug or in a clear plastic bag with a straw inserted for easier travel. In the U.S., it is sold in juice bars or traditional Mexican restaurants in the Mexican American communities of the Southwestern United States. The fermentation process for making tepache is simple and quick, which makes tepache a drink readily produced at home.

Tepache is fermented by different microorganisms. Bacteria, such as Lactobacillus pentosus, L. paracasei, L. plantarum, L. lactis and yeast from the genus Saccharomyces have been found in tepache.

Origin
Tepache dates from Pre-Columbian Mexico, as a popular drink among the Nahua people of central Mexico; in the Nahuatl (also known as Aztec) language, the word tepiātl means "drink made from corn". Originally, corn (maize) was the base of tepache, but the contemporary recipe for tepache uses pineapple rinds as the foodstuff fermented to produce the tart drink that is tepache. Some varieties of tepache, known as tepache de tibicos, are fermented using symbiotic cultures of tibicos.

Commercialization
Because of the popularity of tepache in Mexico, the drink is now being produced commercially as a non-alcoholic drink. There are a few different brands of tepache including Tepache from the Frumex Corporation.
The original Frumex Tepache contained 12% juice and was made from fermented skins and pulp along with some sugar, spices, and barley. That version was replaced with a newer version that contained only 10% juice and no barley. That one was made from only fermented pineapple juice, no skins or pulp. The latest version, now rebranded as Tepachito, still contains only 10% juice but it is made from fermented juice and skin, no barley. It does include white and brown sugar and spices.

In popular culture
The drink tepache is mentioned in the popular Spanish-language quebradita song "La Niña Fresa ("The Spoiled Girl"), by Banda Zeta, in which the spoiled-girl character is offered several types of drink—including tepache—yet she refuses them all, for being beneath her social status.
The drink tepache is also mentioned in Cornelia Reynas song "botellitas" where he is singing about different bottles of alcohol.

See also
Indigenous cuisine
Tejuino
Pulque
Chicha de piña

References

Fermented drinks
Mexican alcoholic drinks
Fruit wines
Indigenous cuisine of the Americas
Cuisine of the Southwestern United States
Cocktails with pineapple